The 2007 Martinique earthquake took place on November 29 2007 at  in the Windward Islands region, underneath the Martinique Passage.

This earthquake was felt strongly in Martinique, Dominica, St. Lucia, Guadeloupe, Montserrat, Antigua, St Kitts and Nevis, Anguilla, British Virgin Islands, U.S. Virgin Islands, and Puerto Rico. Power outages were reported in Martinique, Dominica and Guadeloupe. It was also felt in other Eastern Caribbean islands, from Puerto Rico to the north to Trinidad and Tobago to the south. It could also be felt in part of South America such as in Venezuela, Guyana, Suriname, and French Guiana. In Caracas, Venezuela, some people evacuated office buildings. The intensity reached VI to VII on the EMS98 scale in Martinique and Dominica.

In the surrounding region, the South American Plate is subducting beneath the Caribbean Plate. This earthquake occurred within the South America Plate and was in response to stresses generated by the slow distortion of the plate.

See also
List of earthquakes in 2007
List of earthquakes in France
List of earthquakes in the Caribbean

References

External links

2007 earthquakes
Earthquakes in Martinique
2007 in Martinique
November 2007 events in North America
Earthquakes in Dominica
Earthquakes in Saint Lucia
Earthquakes in Guadeloupe
2007 in Dominica
2007 in Saint Lucia
2007 in Guadeloupe